USS Niagara (SP-263) was a vessel of the United States Navy during World War I.

Niagara, a yacht built in 1915 by E. A. Fonda of Miami, Florida, was purchased by the United States Navy on 5 July 1917 from General H. M. Creel, of Miami, and was designated USS Niagara (SP-263). The navy redesignated the boat as SP-263 on 11 April 1918, dropping the name Niagara.

After the war, on 29 May 1919, she was transferred to the United States Lighthouse Service, converted into a lighthouse tender and rechristened USLHT Poinsettia. She was assigned to the 7th Lighthouse District in Key West, Florida.

Poinsettia was decommissioned on 21 April 1922 at the Philadelphia Navy Yard and was sold.
She caught fire and sank on 27 December 1928.

References

External links
 

Patrol vessels of the United States Navy
World War I patrol vessels of the United States
Lighthouse tenders of the United States
Ships built in Miami
1915 ships